In the 1998–99 Heineken Cup pool stage teams received 
2 points for a win 
1 point for a draw

Pool 1

Pool 2

Pool 3

Pool 4

Seeding

See also

1998-99 Heineken Cup

References

External links

Heineken Cup pool stages
Pool Stage